Lenoir Downtown Historic District is a national historic district located at Lenoir, Caldwell County, North Carolina.  The district includes 41 contributing buildings and 2 contributing objects in the central business district of Lenoir. It includes commercial, governmental, and institutional buildings in a variety of popular architectural styles including Art Deco, Art Moderne, Classical Revival and Tudor Revival.  Notable contributing resources include the Center Theater (1941), O. P. Lutz Furniture Company and Lutz Hosiery Mill (1939), Dayvault's Drug Store (1937), Caldwell County Agricultural Building (1937), Courtney Warehouse (c. 1888), Masonic Hall (1901, 1959), Miller Building (c. 1900, c. 1920s), Confederate Monument (1910), Belk's Department Store (1928), Lenoir Building (1907), J. C. Penney Department Store (1941, c. 1980s), Fidelity Building (1928), and U. S. Post Office (1931).  Located in the district is the separately listed Caldwell County Courthouse.

The district was listed on the National Register of Historic Places in 2007, with a boundary increase in 2013.

References

Historic districts on the National Register of Historic Places in North Carolina
Art Deco architecture in North Carolina
Neoclassical architecture in North Carolina
Tudor Revival architecture in North Carolina
Buildings and structures in Caldwell County, North Carolina
National Register of Historic Places in Caldwell County, North Carolina